The Transporter Classification Database (or TCDB) is an International Union of Biochemistry and Molecular Biology (IUBMB)-approved classification system for membrane transport proteins, including ion channels.

Classification
The upper level of classification and a few examples of proteins with known 3D structure:

1. Channels and pores

1.A α-type channels
 1.A.1 Voltage-gated ion channel superfamily
 1.A.2 Inward-rectifier K+ channel family
 1.A.3 Ryanodine-inositol-1,4,5-trisphosphate receptor Ca2+ channel family
 1.A.4 Transient receptor potential Ca2+ channel family
 1.A.5 Polycystin cation channel family
 1.A.6 Epithelial Na+ channel family
 1.A.7 ATP-gated P2X receptor cation channel family
 1.A.8 Major intrinsic protein superfamily
 1.A.9 Neurotransmitter receptor, Cys loop, ligand-gated ion channel family
 1.A.10 Glutamate-gated ion channel family of neurotransmitter receptors
 1.A.11 Ammonium channel transporter family
 1.A.12 Intracellular chloride channel family
 1.A.13 Epithelial chloride channel family
 1.A.14 Testis-enhanced gene transfer family
 1.A.15 Nonselective cation channel-2 family
 1.A.16 Formate-nitrite transporter family
 1.A.17 Calcium-dependent chloride channel family
 1.A.18 Chloroplast envelope anion-channel-forming Tic110 family
 1.A.19 Type A influenza virus matrix-2 channel family
 1.A.20 BCL2/Adenovirus E1B-interacting protein 3 family
 1.A.21 Bcl-2 family
 1.A.22 Large-conductance mechanosensitive ion channel
 1.A.23 Small-conductance mechanosensitive ion channel
 1.A.24 Gap-junction-forming connexin family
 1.A.25 Gap-junction-forming innexin family
 1.A.26 Mg2+ transporter-E family
 1.A.27 Phospholemman family
 1.A.28 Urea transporter family
 1.A.29 Urea/amide channel family
 1.A.30 H+- or Na+-translocating bacterial MotAB flagellar motor/ExbBD outer-membrane transport energizer superfamily
 1.A.31 Annexin family
 1.A.32 Type B influenza virus NB channel family
 1.A.33 Cation-channel-forming heat shock protein 70 family
 1.A.34 Bacillus gap junction-like channel-forming complex family
 1.A.35 CorA metal ion transporter family
 1.A.36 Intracellular chloride channel family
 1.A.37 CD20 Ca2+ channel family
 1.A.38 Golgi pH regulator family
 1.A.39 Type C influenza virus CM2 channel family
 1.A.40 Human immunodeficiency virus type I Vpu channel family
 1.A.41 Avian reovirus p10 Vvroporin family
 1.A.42 HIV viral protein R family
 1.A.43 Camphor resistance or fluoride exporter family
 1.A.44 Pore-forming tail Tip pb2 protein of phage T5 family
 1.A.45 Phage P22 injectisome family
 1.A.46 Anion channel-forming bestrophin family
 1.A.47 Nucleotide-sensitive anion-selective channel, ICln family
 1.A.48 Anion channel Tweety family
 1.A.49 Human coronavirus ns12.9 viroporin family
 1.A.50 Phospholamban (Ca2+-channel and Ca2+-ATPase regulator) family
1.A.51 The Voltage-gated Proton Channel (VPC) Family
1.A.52 The Ca2+ Release-activated Ca2+ (CRAC) Channel (CRAC-C) Family
1.A.53 The Hepatitis C Virus P7 Viroporin Cation-selective Channel (HCV-P7) Family
1.A.54 The Presenilin ER Ca2+ Leak Channel (Presenilin) Family
1.A.55 The Synaptic Vesicle-Associated Ca2+ Channel, Flower (Flower) Family
1.A.56 The Copper Transporter (Ctr) Family
1.A.57 The Human SARS Coronavirus Viroporin (SARS-VP)
1.A.58 The Type B Influenza Virus Matrix Protein 2 (BM2-C) Family
1.A.59 The Bursal Disease Virus Pore-Forming Peptide, Pep46 (Pep46) Family
1.A.60 The Mammalian Reovirus Pre-forming Peptide, Mu-1 (Mu-1) Family
1.A.61 The Insect Nodavirus Channel-forming Chain F (Gamma-Peptide) Family
1.A.62 The Homotrimeric Cation Channel (TRIC) Family
1.A.63 The Ignicoccus Outer Membrane α-helical Porin (I-OMP Family
1.A.64 The Plasmolipin (Plasmolipin) Family
1.A.65 The Coronavirus Viroporin E Protein (Viroporin E) Family
1.A.66 The Pardaxin (Pardaxin) Family
1.A.67 The Membrane Mg2+ Transporter (MMgT) Family 
1.A.68 The Viral Small Hydrophobic Viroporin (V-SH) Family
1.A.69 The Heteromeric Odorant Receptor Channel (HORC) Family
1.A.70 The Molecule Against Microbes A (MamA) Family 
1.A.71 The Brain Acid-soluble Protein Channel (BASP1 Channel) Family 
1.A.72 The Mer Superfamily
1.A.73 The Colicin Lysis Protein (CLP) Family 
1.A.74 The Mitsugumin 23 (MG23) Family
1.A.75 The Mechanical Nociceptor, Piezo (Piezo) Family
1.A.76 The Magnesium Transporter1 (MagT1) Family
1.A.77 The Mg2+/Ca2+ Uniporter (MCU) Family
1.A.78 The K+-selective Channel in Endosomes and Lysosomes (KEL) Family
1.A.79 The Cholesterol Uptake Protein (ChUP) or Double Stranded RNA Uptake Family
1.A.80 The NS4a Viroporin (NS4a) Family
1.A.81 The Low Affinity Ca2+ Channel (LACC) Family
1.A.82 The Hair Cell Mechanotransduction Channel (HCMC) Family
1.A.83 The SV40 Virus Viroporin VP2 (SV40 VP2) Family
1.A.84 The Calcium Homeostasis Modulator Ca2+ Channel (CALHM-C) Family
1.A.85 The Poliovirus 2B Viroporin (2B Viroporin) Family
1.A.86 The Human Papilloma Virus type 16 (HPV16) L2 Viroporin (L2 Viroporin) Family
1.A.87 The Mechanosensitive Calcium Channel (MCA) Family
1.A.88 The Fungal Potassium Channel (F-Kch) Family
1.A.89 The Human Coronavirus 229E Viroporin (229E Viroporin) Family
1.A.90 The Human Metapneumovirus (HMPV) Viroporin (HMPV-Viroporin) Family
1.A.91 The Cytoadherence-linked Asexual Protein 3.2 of Plasmodium falciparum (Clag3) Family
1.A.92 The Reovirus Viroporin VP10 (RVP10) Family
1.A.93 The Bluetongue Virus Non-Structural Protein 3 Viroporin (NS3) Family
1.A.94 The Rotavirus Non-structural Glycoprotein 4 Viroporin (NSP4) Family
1.A.95 The Ephemerovirus Viroporin (EVVP) Family
1.A.96 The Human Polyoma Virus Viroporin (PVVP) Family 
1.A.97 The Human Papillomavirus type 16 E5 Viroporin (HPV-E5) Family
1.A.98 Human T-Lymphotropic Virus 1 P13 protein (HTLV1-P13) Family
1.A.99 The Infectious Bronchitis Virus Envelope Small Membrane Protein E (IBV-E) Family 
1.A.100 The Rhabdoviridae Putative Viroporin, U5 (RV-U5) Family
1.A.101 The Peroxisomal Pore-forming Pex11 (Pex11) Family
1.A.102 Influenza A viroporin PB1-F2 (PB1-F2) Family
1.A.103 The Simian Virus 5 (Parainfluenza Virus 5) SH (SV5-SH) Family
1.A.104 The Proposed Flagellar Biosynthesis Na+ Channel, FlaH (FlaH) Family
1.A.105 The Mixed Lineage Kinase Domain-like (MLKL) Family
1.A.106 The Calcium Load-activated Calcium Channel (CLAC) Family 
1.A.107 The Pore-forming Globin (Globin) Family

1.B. β-Barrel porins and other outer membrane proteins
 1.B.1 General bacterial porin family
 1.B.2 Chlamydial porin (CP) family
 1.B.3 Sugar porin (SP) family
 1.B.4 Brucella-Rhizobium porin (BRP) family
 1.B.5 Pseudomonas OprP porin (POP) family
 1.B.6 OmpA-OmpF porin (OOP) family
 1.B.7 Rhodobacter PorCa porin (RPP) family
 1.B.8 Mitochondrial and plastid porin (MPP) family
 1.B.9 FadL outer membrane protein (FadL) family
 1.B.10 Nucleoside-specific channel-forming outer membrane porin (Tsx) family
 1.B.11 Outer membrane fimbrial usher porin (FUP) family
 1.B.12 Autotransporter-1 (AT-1) family
 1.B.13 Alginate export porin (AEP) family
 1.B.14 Outer membrane receptor (OMR) family
 1.B.15 Raffinose porin (RafY) family
 1.B.16 Short chain amide and urea porin (SAP) family
 1.B.17 Outer membrane factor (OMF) family
 1.B.18 Outer membrane auxiliary (OMA) protein family
 1.B.19 Glucose-selective OprB porin (OprB) family
 1.B.20 Two-partner secretion (TPS) family
 1.B.21 OmpG porin (OmpG) family
 1.B.22 Outer bacterial membrane secretin (secretin) family
 1.B.23 Cyanobacterial porin (CBP) family
 1.B.24 Mycobacterial porin
 1.B.25 Outer membrane porin (Opr) family
 1.B.26 Cyclodextrin porin (CDP) family
 1.B.31 Campylobacter jejuni major outer membrane porin (MomP) family
 1.B.32 Fusobacterial outer membrane porin (FomP) family
 1.B.33 Outer membrane protein insertion porin (Bam complex) (OmpIP) family
 1.B.34 Corynebacterial porins
 1.B.35 Oligogalacturonate-specific porin (KdgM) family
 1.B.39 Bacterial porin, OmpW (OmpW) family
 1.B.42 Outer membrane lipopolysaccharide export porin (LPS-EP) family
 1.B.43 Coxiella porin P1 (CPP1) family
 1.B.44 Probable protein translocating porphyromonas gingivalis porin (PorT) family
 1.B.49 Anaplasma P44 (A-P44) porin family
 1.B.48 Curli-like transporters
 1.B.54 Intimin/Invasin (Int/Inv) or Autotransporter-3 family
 1.B.55 Poly-acetyl-D-glucosamine porin (PgaA) family
 1.B.57 Legionella major-outer membrane protein (LM-OMP) family
 1.B.60 Omp50 porin (Omp50 Porin) family
 1.B.61 Delta-proteobacterial porin (Delta-porin) family
 1.B.62 Putative bacterial porin (PBP) family
 1.B.66 Putative beta-barrel porin-2 (BBP2) family
 1.B.67 Putative beta barrel porin-4 (BBP4) family
 1.B.68 Putative beta barrel porin-5 (BBP5) superfamily
 1.B.70 Outer membrane channel (OMC) family
 1.B.71 Proteobacterial/verrucomicrobial porin (PVP) family
 1.B.72 Protochlamydial outer membrane porin (PomS/T) family
 1.B.73 Capsule biogenesis/assembly (CBA) family
 1.B.78 DUF3374 electron transport-associated porin (ETPorin) family

1.C Pore-forming toxins (proteins and peptides)
 1.C.3 α-Hemolysin (αHL) family
 1.C.4 Aerolysin family
 1.C.5 ε-toxin family
 1.C.11 RTX-toxin superfamily
 1.C.12 Membrane attack complex/perforin superfamily
 1.C.13 Leukocidin family
 1.C.14 Cytohemolysin (CHL) family
 1.C.39 Thiol-activated cholesterol-dependent cytolysin family
 1.C.43 Lysenin family
 1.C.56 Pseudomonas syringae HrpZ cation channel family
 1.C.57 Clostridial cytotoxin family
1.C.58 The Microcin E492/C24 (Microcin E492) Family
 1.C.74 Snake cytotoxin (SCT) family
 1.C.97 Pleurotolysin pore-forming family

1.D Non-ribosomally synthesized channels
 1.D.1 The Gramicidin A Channel Family
 1.D.2 The Channel-forming Syringomycin Family
 1.D.3 The Channel-Forming Syringopeptin Family
 1.D.4 The Tolaasin Channel-forming Family
 1.D.5 The Alamethicin or Peptaibol Antibiotic Channel-forming Family
 1.D.6 The Complexed Poly 3-Hydroxybutyrate Ca2+ Channel (cPHB-CC) Family
 1.D.7 The Beticolin Family
 1.D.8 The Saponin Family
 1.D.9 The Polyglutamine Ion Channel (PG-IC) Family
 1.D.10 The Ceramide-forming Channel Family
 1.D.11 The Surfactin Family
 1.D.12 The Beauvericin (Beauvericin) Family
 1.D.13 DNA-delivery Amphipathic Peptide Antibiotics (DAPA)
 1.D.14 The Synthetic Leu/Ser Amphipathic Channel-forming Peptide (l/S-SCP) Family
 1.D.15 The Daptomycin (Daptomycin) Family
 1.D.16 The Synthetic Amphipathic Pore-forming Heptapeptide (SAPH) Family
 1.D.17 Combinatorially-designed, Pore-forming, β-sheet Peptide Family
 1.D.18 The Pore-forming Guanosine-Bile Acid Conjugate Family
 1.D.19 Ca2+ Channel-forming Drug, Digitoxin Family
 1.D.20 The Pore-forming Polyene Macrolide Antibiotic/fungal Agent (PMAA) Family
 1.D.21 The Lipid Nanopore (LipNP) Family
 1.D.22 The Proton-Translocating Carotenoid Pigment, Zeaxanthin Family
 1.D.23 Phenylene Ethynylene Pore-forming Antimicrobial (PEPA) Family
 1.D.24 The Marine Sponge Polytheonamide B (pTB) Family
 1.D.25 The Arylamine Foldamer (AAF) Family
 1.D.26 The Dihydrodehydrodiconiferyl alcohol 9'-O-β-D-glucoside (DDDC9G) Family
 1.D.27 The Thiourea isosteres Family
 1.D.28 The Lipopeptaibol Family
 1.D.29 The Macrocyclic Oligocholate Family
 1.D.30 The Artificial Hydrazide-appended pillar[5]arene Channels (HAPA-C) Family
 1.D.31 The Amphotericin B Family
 1.D.32 The Pore-forming Novicidin Family
 1.D.33 The Channel-forming Polytheonamide B Family
 1.D.34 The Channel-forming Oligoester Bolaamphiphiles
 1.D.35 The Pore-forming cyclic Lipodepsipeptide Family
 1.D.36 The Oligobornene Ion Channel Family
 1.D.37 The Hibicuslide C Family
 1.D.38 The Cyclic Peptide Nanotube (cPepNT) Family
 1.D.39 The Light-controlled Azobenzene-based Amphiphilic Molecular Ion Channel (AAM-IC) Family
 1.D.40 The Protein-induced Lipid Toroidal Pore Family
 1.D.41 The Sprotetonate-type Ionophore (Spirohexanolide) Family
 1.D.42 The Phe-Arg Tripeptide-Pillar[5]Arene Channel (TPPA-C) Family
 1.D.43 The Triazole-tailored Guanosine Dinucleoside Channel (TT-GDN-C) Family
 1.D.44 The Synthetic Ion Channel with Redox-active Ferrocene (ICRF) Family
 1.D.45 The Sonoporation and Electroporation Membrane Pore (SEMP) Family
 1.D.46 The DNA Nanopore (DnaNP) Family
 1.D.47 The Pore-forming Synthetic Cyclic Peptide (PSCP) Family
 1.D.48 The Pore-forming Syringomycin E Family
 1.D.49 The Transmembrane Carotenoid Radical Channel (CRC) Family
 1.D.50 The Amphiphilic bis-Catechol Anion Transporter (AC-AT) Family
 1.D.51 The Protein Nanopore (ProNP) Family
 1.D.52 The Aromatic Oligoamide Macrocycle Nanopore (OmnNP) Family
 1.D.53 The alpha, gamma-Peptide Nanotube (a,gPepNT) Family
 1.D.54 The potassium-selective Hexyl-Benzoureido-15-Crown-5-Ether Ion Channel (HBEC) Family
 1.D.55 The Porphyrin-based Nanopore (PorNP) Family
 1.D.56 The Alpha-Aminoisobutyrate (Aib) Oligomeric Nanopore (AibNP) Family
 1.D.57 The Lipid Electro-Pore (LEP) Family
 1.D.58 The Anion Transporting Prodigiosene (Prodigiosene) Family
 1.D.59 The Anion Transporting Perenosin (Perenosin) Family
 1.D.60 The Alpha,Gamma-Cyclic Peptide (AGCP) Family
 1.D.61 The Anionophoric  (ABBP) Family
 1.D.62 The Bis-Triazolyl DiGuanosine Derivative Channel-forming (TDG) Family
 1.D.63 The Peptide-based Nanopore (PepNP) Family
 1.D.64 The Carbon Nanotube (CarNT) Family
 1.D.65 The Pore-forming Amphidinol (Amphidinol) Family
 1.D.66 The Helical Macromolecule Nanopore (HmmNP) Family
 1.D.67 The Crown Ether-modified Helical Peptide Ion Channel (CEHP) Family
 1.D.68 The Pore-forming Pleuronic Block Polymer (PPBP) Family
 1.D.69 The Conical Nanopore (ConNP) Family
 1.D.70 The Metallic (Au/Ag/Pt/graphene) Nanopore (MetNP) Family
 1.D.71 The Synthetic TP359 Peptide (TP359) Family
 1.D.72 The Chloride Carrier Triazine-based Tripodal Receptor (CCTTR) Family
 1.D.73 The Mesoporous Silica Nanopore (SilNP) Family
 1.D.74 The Stimulus-responsive Synthetic Rigid p-Octiphenyl Stave Pore (SSROP) Family

1.E Holins

1.F Vesicle fusion pores
 1.F.1 The Synaptosomal Vesicle Fusion Pore (SVF-Pore) Family
 1.F.2 The Octameric Exocyst (Exocyst) Family

1.G Viral fusion pores
 1.G.1 The Viral Pore-forming Membrane Fusion Protein-1 (VMFP1) Family
 1.G.2 The Viral Pore-forming Membrane Fusion Protein-2 (VMFP2) Family
 1.G.3 The Viral Pore-forming Membrane Fusion Protein-3 (VMFP3) Family
 1.G.4 The Viral Pore-forming Membrane Fusion Protein-4 (VMFP4) Family
 1.G.5 The Viral Pore-forming Membrane Fusion Protein-5 (VMFP5) Family
 1.G.6 The Hepadnaviral S Fusion Protein (HBV-S Protein) Family
 1.G.7 The Reovirus FAST Fusion Protein (R-FAST) Family
 1.G.8 The Arenavirus Fusion Protein (AV-FP) Family
 1.G.9 The Syncytin (Syncytin) Family
 1.G.10 The Herpes Simplex Virus Membrane Fusion Complex (HSV-MFC) Family
 1.G.11 Poxvirus Cell Entry Protein Complex (PEP-C) Family
 1.G.12 The Avian Leukosis Virus gp95 Fusion Protein (ALV-gp95) Family
 1.G.13 The Orthoreovirus Fusion-associated Small Transmembrane (FAST) Family
 1.G.14 The Influenza Virus Hemagglutinin/Fusion Pore-forming Protein (Influenza-H/FPP) Family
 1.G.15 The Autographa californica Nuclear Polyhedrosis Virus Major Envelope Glycoprotein GP64 (GP64) Family
 1.G.16 The Human Immunodeficiency Virus Type 1 (HIV-1) Fusion Peptide (HIV-FP) Family
 1.G.17 The Bovine Leukemia Virus Envelop Glycoprotein (BLV-Env) Family
 1.G.18 The SARS-CoV Fusion Peptide in the Spike Glycoprotein Precursor (SARS-FP) Family
 1.G.19 The Rotavirus Pore-forming Membrane Fusion Complex (Rotavirus MFC) Family
 1.G.20 The Hantavirus Gc Envelope Fusion Glycoprotein (Gc-EFG) Family
 1.G.21 The Epstein Barr Virus (Human Herpes Virus 4) Gp42 (Gp42) Family
 1.G.22 The Cytomegalovirus (Human Herpesvirus 5) Glycoprotein gO (gO) Family

1.H Paracellular channels
 1.H.1 The Claudin Tight Junction (Claudin1) Family
 1.H.2 The Invertebrate PMP22-Claudin (Claudin2) Family

1.I Membrane-bound channels
 1.I.1 Nuclear pore complex family, including karyopherins
 1.I.2 Plant plasmodesmata family

2. Electrochemical potential-driven transporters

2.A Porters (uniporters, symporters, antiporters)

2.A.1 Major Facilitator superfamily (MFS), see also Lactose permease, Phosphate permease and Glucose transporter
2.A.2 The Glycoside-Pentoside-Hexuronide (GPH):Cation Symporter Family
2.A.3 The Amino Acid-Polyamine-Organocation (APC) Family
2.A.4 Cation diffusion facilitator (CDF) Family
2.A.5 Zinc (Zn2+)-Iron (Fe2+) Permease Family
2.A.6 Resistance-Nodulation-Cell Division Superfamily, see also SecDF protein-export membrane protein
2.A.7 The Drug/Metabolite Transporter (DMT) Superfamily
2.A.8 The Gluconate:H+ Symporter (GntP) Family
2.A.9 The Membrane Protein Insertase (YidC/Alb3/Oxa1) Family
2.A.10 The 2-Keto-3-Deoxygluconate Transporter (KdgT) Family
2.A.11 The Citrate-Mg2+:H+ (CitM) Citrate-Ca2+:H+ (CitH) Symporter (CitMHS) Family
2.A.12 ATP:ADP Antiporter Family
2.A.13 The C4-Dicarboxylate Uptake (Dcu) Family
2.A.14 Lactate Permease Family
2.A.15 The Betaine/Carnitine/Choline Transporter (BCCT) Family
2.A.16 Tellurite-resistance/Dicarboxylate Transporter Family
2.A.17 Proton-dependent Oligopeptide Transporter Family
2.A.18 The Amino Acid/Auxin Permease (AAAP) Family
2.A.19 The Ca2+:Cation Antiporter (CaCA) Family
2.A.20 The Inorganic Phosphate Transporter (PiT) Family
2.A.21 Solute:Sodium Symporter Family
2.A.22 The Neurotransmitter:Sodium Symporter Family
2.A.23 The Dicarboxylate/Amino Acid:Cation (Na+ or H+) Symporter (DAACS) Family
2.A.24 The 2-Hydroxycarboxylate Transporter (2-HCT) Family
2.A.25 Alanine or Glycine:Cation Symporter (AGCS) Family
2.A.26 The Branched Chain Amino Acid:Cation Symporter (LIVCS) Family
2.A.27 The Glutamate:Na+ Symporter (ESS) Family
2.A.28 Bile Acid:Na+ Symporter Family
2.A.29 Mitochondrial carrier Family
2.A.30 Cation-Chloride Cotransporter (CCC) Family
2.A.31 Anion Exchanger Family
2.A.32 The Silicon Transporter (Sit) Family
2.A.33 NhaA Na+:H+ Antiporter (NhaA) Family
2.A.34 The NhaB Na+:H+ Antiporter (NhaB) Family
2.A.35 The NhaC Na+:H+ Antiporter (NhaC) Family
2.A.36 Monovalent Cation:Proton Antiporter-1 (CPA1) Family
2.A.37 Monovalent Cation:Proton Antiporter-2 (CPA2) Family
2.A.38 K+ Transporter (Trk) Family
2.A.39 Nucleobase:Cation Symporter-1 (NCS1) Family
2.A.40 Nucleobase:Cation Symporter-2 (NCS2) Family
2.A.41 The Concentrative Nucleoside Transporter (CNT) Family
2.A.42 The Hydroxy/Aromatic Amino Acid Permease (HAAAP) Family
2.A.43 The Lysosomal Cystine Transporter (LCT) Family
2.A.45 Arsenite-Antimonite Efflux Family
2.A.46 The Benzoate:H+ Symporter (BenE) Family
2.A.47 Divalent Anion:Na+ Symporter (DASS) Family
2.A.48 The Reduced Folate Carrier (RFC) Family
2.A.49 Chloride Carrier/Channel (ClC) Family
2.A.50 The Glycerol Uptake (GUP) Family
2.A.51 The Chromate Ion Transporter (CHR) Family
2.A.52 The Ni2+-Co2+ Transporter (NiCoT) Family
2.A.53 Sulfate permease (SulP) Family
2.A.54 The Mitochondrial Tricarboxylate Carrier (MTC) Family
2.A.55 The Metal Ion (Mn2+-iron) Transporter (Nramp) Family
2.A.56 The Tripartite ATP-independent Periplasmic Transporter (TRAP-T) Family
2.A.57 The Equilibrative Nucleoside Transporter (ENT) Family
2.A.58 The Phosphate:Na+ Symporter (PNaS) Family
2.A.59 The Arsenical Resistance-3 (ACR3) Family
2.A.60 Organo Anion Transporter (OAT) Family
2.A.61 The C4-dicarboxylate Uptake C (DcuC) Family
2.A.62 The NhaD Na+:H+ Antiporter (NhaD) Family
2.A.63 The Monovalent Cation (K+ or Na+):Proton Antiporter-3 (CPA3) Family
2.A.64 Twin Arginine Targeting (Tat) Family
2.A.65 The Bilirubin Transporter (BRT) Family
2.A.66 The Multidrug/Oligosaccharidyl-lipid/Polysaccharide (MOP) Flippase Superfamily
2.A.67 The Oligopeptide Transporter (OPT) Family
2.A.68 The p-Aminobenzoyl-glutamate Transporter (AbgT) Family
2.A.69 The Auxin Efflux Carrier (AEC) Family
2.A.70 The Malonate:Na+ Symporter (MSS) Family
2.A.71 The Folate-Biopterin Transporter (FBT) Family
2.A.72 The K+ Uptake Permease (KUP) Family
2.A.73 The Short Chain Fatty Acid Uptake (AtoE) Family
2.A.74 The 4 TMS Multidrug Endosomal Transporter (MET) Family
2.A.75 The L-Lysine Exporter (LysE) Family
2.A.76 The Resistance to Homoserine/Threonine (RhtB) Family
2.A.77 The Cadmium Resistance (CadD) Family
2.A.78 The Branched Chain Amino Acid Exporter (LIV-E) Family
2.A.79 The Threonine/Serine Exporter (ThrE) Family
2.A.80 The Tricarboxylate Transporter (TTT) Family
2.A.81 The Aspartate:Alanine Exchanger (AAEx) Family
2.A.82 The Organic Solute Transporter (OST) Family
2.A.83 The Na+-dependent Bicarbonate Transporter (SBT) Family
2.A.84 The Chloroplast Maltose Exporter (MEX) Family
2.A.85 The Aromatic Acid Exporter (ArAE) Family
2.A.86 The Autoinducer-2 Exporter (AI-2E) Family (Formerly the PerM Family, TC #9.B.22)
2.A.87 The Prokaryotic Riboflavin Transporter (P-RFT) Family
2.A.88 Vitamin Uptake Transporter (VUT or ECF) Family
2.A.89 The Vacuolar Iron Transporter (VIT) Family
2.A.90 Vitamin A Receptor/Transporter (STRA6) Family
2.A.91 Mitochondrial tRNA Import Complex (M-RIC) (Formerly 9.C.8)
2.A.92 The Choline Transporter-like (CTL) Family
2.A.94 The Phosphate Permease (Pho1) Family
2.A.95 The 6TMS Neutral Amino Acid Transporter (NAAT) Family
2.A.96 The Acetate Uptake Transporter (AceTr) Family
2.A.97 The Mitochondrial Inner Membrane K+/H+ and Ca2+/H+ Exchanger (LetM1) Family
2.A.98 The Putative Sulfate Exporter (PSE) Family
2.A.99 The 6TMS Ni2+ uptake transporter (HupE-UreJ) Family
2.A.100 The Ferroportin (Fpn) Family
2.A.101 The Malonate Uptake (MatC) Family (Formerly UIT1)
2.A.102 The 4-Toluene Sulfonate Uptake Permease (TSUP) Family
2.A.103 The Bacterial Murein Precursor Exporter (MPE) Family
2.A.104 The L-Alanine Exporter (AlaE) Family
2.A.105 The Mitochondrial Pyruvate Carrier (MPC) Family
2.A.106 The Ca2+:H+ Antiporter-2 (CaCA2) Family
2.A.107 The MntP Mn2+ Exporter (MntP) Family
2.A.108 The Iron/Lead Transporter (ILT) Family
2.A.109 The Tellurium Ion Resistance (TerC) Family
2.A.110 The Heme Transporter, heme-responsive gene protein (HRG) Family
2.A.111 The Na+/H+ Antiporter-E (NhaE) Family
2.A.112 The KX Blood-group Antigen (KXA) Family
2.A.113 The Nickel/cobalt Transporter (NicO) Family
2.A.114 The Putative Peptide Transporter Carbon Starvation CstA (CstA) Family
2.A.115 The Novobiocin Exporter (NbcE) Family
2.A.116 The Peptidoglycolipid Addressing Protein (GAP) Family
2.A.117 The Chlorhexadine Exporter (CHX) family
2.A.118 The Basic Amino Acid Antiporter (ArcD) Family
2.A.119 The Organo-Arsenical Exporter (ArsP) Family
2.A.120 The Putative Amino Acid Permease (PAAP) Family
2.A.121 The Sulfate Transporter (CysZ) Family
2.A.122 The LrgB/CidB holin-like auxiliary protein (LrgB/CidB) Family
2.A.123 The Sweet; PQ-loop; Saliva; MtN3 (Sweet) Family
2.A.124 The Lysine Exporter (LysO) Family
2.A.125 The Eukaryotic Riboflavin Transporter (E-RFT) Family
2.A.126 The Fatty Acid Exporter (FAX) Family
2.A.127 Enterobacterial Cardiolipin Transporter (CLT) Family

2.B Nonribosomally synthesized porters
2.B.1 The Valinomycin Carrier Family
2.B.2 The Monensin Family
2.B.3 The Nigericin Family
2.B.4 The Macrotetrolide Antibiotic (MA) Family
2.B.5 The Macrocyclic Polyether (MP) Family
2.B.6 The Ionomycin Family
2.B.7 The Transmembrane α-helical Peptide Phospholipid Translocation (TMP-PLT) Family
2.B.8 The Bafilomycin A1 (Bafilomycin) Family
2.B.9 The Cell Penetrating Peptide (CPP) Functional Family
2.B.10 The Synthetic CPP, Transportan Family 
2.B.11 The Calcimycin or A23187 Carrier-type Ionophore Family
2.B.12 The Salinomycin Family
2.B.13 The Tetrapyrrolic Macrocyclic Anion Antiporter (TPMC-AA) Family
2.B.14 The Lasalocid A or X-537A Ionophore (Lasalocid) Family
2.B.15 The Tris-thiourea Tripodal-based Chloride Carrier (TTT-CC) Family 
2.B.16 The Halogen-bond-containing Compound Anion Carrier (HCAC) Family
2.B.17 The Isophthalaminde Derivative H+:Cl− Co-transporter (IDC) Family
2.B.18 The Pyridine-2,6-Dicarboxamine Derivative (PDCA) H+:Cl− Co-transporter Family 
2.B.19 The Calix(4)pyrrole Derivative (C4P) Family
2.B.20 The Prodigiosin (Prodigiosin) Chloride/Bicarbonate Exchanger Family
2.B.21 The ortho-Phenylenediamine-bis-Urea Derivative Anion Transporter (oPDA-U) Family 
2.B.22 The Imidazolium-functionalized Anion Transporter (IAT) Family
2.B.23 The Homotetrameric Transmembrane Zn2+/Co2+:Proton Synthetic Antiporter, Rocker (Rocker) Family
2.B.24 The  Anion Carrier (BBP-AC) Family
2.B.25 The Peptide-mediated Lipid Flip-Flop (PLFF) Family
2.B.26 The   Conjugate (BIBCC) Family
2.B.27 The Tris-Urea Anion Transporter Family
2.B.29 The Anionophoric Marine Alkaloid Tambjamine Family

2.C Ion-gradient-driven energizers
2.C.1 The TonB-ExbB-ExbD/TolA-TolQ-TolR (TonB) Family of Auxiliary Proteins for Energization of Outer Membrane Receptor (OMR)-mediated Active Transport

3. Primary active transporters

3.A. P-P-bond hydrolysis-driven transporters
3.A.1 ABC transporters including BtuCD, molybdate uptake transporter, Cystic fibrosis transmembrane conductance regulator and others
3.A.2 The H+- or Na+-translocating F-type ATPase, V-type ATPase and A-type ATPase superfamily
3.A.3 The P-type ATPase Superfamily
3.A.4 The Arsenite-Antimonite efflux family
3.A.5 General secretory pathway (Sec) translocon (preprotein translocase SecY)
3.A.6 The Type III (Virulence-related) Secretory Pathway (IIISP) Family
3.A.7 The Type IV (Conjugal DNA-Protein Transfer or VirB) Secretory Pathway (IVSP) Family
3.A.8 The Mitochondrial Protein Translocase (MPT) Family
3.A.9 The Chloroplast Envelope Protein Translocase (CEPT or Tic-Toc) Family
3.A.10 H+, Na+-translocating Pyrophosphatase family
3.A.11 The Bacterial Competence-related DNA Transformation Transporter (DNA-T) Family
3.A.12 The Septal DNA Translocator (S-DNA-T) Family
3.A.13 The Filamentous Phage Exporter (FPhE) Family
3.A.14 The Fimbrilin/Protein Exporter (FPE) Family
3.A.15 The Outer Membrane Protein Secreting Main Terminal Branch (MTB) Family
3.A.16 The Endoplasmic Reticular Retrotranslocon (ER-RT) Family
3.A.17 The Phage T7 Injectisome (T7 Injectisome) Family
3.A.18 The Nuclear mRNA Exporter (mRNA-E) Family
3.A.19 The TMS Recognition/Insertion Complex (TRC) Family
3.A.20 The Peroxisomal Protein Importer (PPI) Family
3.A.21 The C-terminal Tail-Anchored Membrane Protein Biogenesis/ Insertion Complex (TAMP-B) Family
3.A.22 The Transcription-coupled TREX/TAP Nuclear mRNA Export Complex (TREX) Family
3.A.23 The Type VI Symbiosis/Virulence Secretory Pathway (VISP) Family
3.A.24 Type VII or ESX Protein Secretion System (T7SS) Family
3.A.25 The Symbiont-specific ERAD-like Machinery (SELMA) Family
3.A.26 The Plasmodium Translocon of Exported proteins (PTEX) Family

3.B Decarboxylation-driven transporters
3.B.1 The Na+-transporting Carboxylic Acid Decarboxylase (NaT-DC) Family

3.C Methyltransfer-driven transporters
3.C.1 The Na+ Transporting Methyltetrahydromethanopterin:Coenzyme M Methyltransferase (NaT-MMM) Family

3.D. Oxidoreduction-driven transporters
They include a number of transmembrane cytochrome b-like proteins including coenzyme Q - cytochrome c reductase (cytochrome bc1 ); cytochrome b6f complex; formate dehydrogenase, respiratory nitrate reductase; succinate - coenzyme Q reductase (fumarate reductase); and succinate dehydrogenase.  See electron transport chain.

3.D.1 The H+ or Na+-translocating NADH Dehydrogenase ("complex I") family 
3.D.2 The Proton-translocating Transhydrogenase (PTH) Family
3.D.3 The Proton-translocating Quinol:Cytochrome c Reductase) Superfamily
3.D.4 Proton-translocating Cytochrome Oxidase (COX) Superfamily
3.D.5 The Na+-translocating NADH:Quinone Dehydrogenase (Na-NDH or NQR) Family
3.D.6 The Putative Ion (H+ or Na+)-translocating NADH:Ferredoxin Oxidoreductase (NFO or RNF) Family
3.D.7 The H2:Heterodisulfide Oxidoreductase (HHO) Family
3.D.8 The Na+- or H+-Pumping Formyl Methanofuran Dehydrogenase (FMF-DH) Family
3.D.9 The H+-translocating F420H2 Dehydrogenase (F420H2DH) Family
3.D.10 The Prokaryotic Succinate Dehydrogenase (SDH) Family

3.E. Light absorption-driven transporters
Bacteriorhodopsin-like proteins including rhodopsin (see also opsin)
Bacterial photosynthetic reaction centres and photosystems I and II
Light harvesting complexes from bacteria and chloroplasts

4. Group translocators

4.A Phosphotransfer-driven group translocators

4.A.1 The PTS Glucose-Glucoside (Glc) Family
4.A.2 The PTS Fructose-Mannitol (Fru) Family
4.A.3 The PTS Lactose-N,N'-Diacetylchitobiose-β-glucoside (Lac) Family
4.A.4 The PTS Glucitol (Gut) Family
4.A.5 The PTS Galactitol (Gat) Family
4.A.6 The PTS Mannose-Fructose-Sorbose (Man) Family
4.A.7 The PTS L-Ascorbate (L-Asc) Family

4.B Nicotinamide ribonucleoside uptake transporters
4.B.1 The Nicotinamide Ribonucleoside (NR) Uptake Permease (PnuC) Family

4.C Acyl CoA ligase-coupled transporters
4.C.1 The Proposed Fatty Acid Transporter (FAT) Family
4.C.2 The Carnitine O-Acyl Transferase (CrAT) Family
4.C.3 The Acyl-CoA Thioesterase (AcoT) Family

4.D Polysaccharide Synthase/Exporters
4.D.1 The Putative Vectorial Glycosyl Polymerization (VGP) Family
4.D.2 The Glycosyl Transferase 2 (GT2) Family
4.D.3 The Glycan Glucosyl Transferase (OpgH) Family

4.E. Vacuolar Polyphosphate Polymerase-catalyzed Group Translocators
4.E.1 The Vacuolar (Acidocalcisome) Polyphosphate Polymerase (V-PPP) Family

5. Transport electron carriers

5.A Transmembrane 2-electron transfer carriers
5.A.1 The Disulfide Bond Oxidoreductase D (DsbD) Family
5.A.2 The Disulfide Bond Oxidoreductase B (DsbB) Family
5.A.3 The Prokaryotic Molybdopterin-containing Oxidoreductase (PMO) Family

5.B Transmembrane 1-electron transfer carriers
5.B.1 The Phagocyte (gp91phox) NADPH Oxidase Family
5.B.2 The Eukaryotic Cytochrome b561 (Cytb561) Family
5.B.3 The Geobacter Nanowire Electron Transfer (G-NET) Family
5.B.4 The Plant Photosystem I Supercomplex (PSI) Family
5.B.5 The Extracellular Metal Oxido-Reductase (EMOR) Family
5.B.6 The Transmembrane Epithelial Antigen Protein-3 Ferric Reductase (STEAP) Family
5.B.7 The YedZ (YedZ) Family
5.B.8 The Trans-Outer Membrane Electron Transfer Porin/Cytochrome Complex (ET-PCC) Family
5.B.9 The Porin-Cytochrome c (Cyc2) Family

8. Accessory factors involved in transport

8.A Auxiliary transport proteins

8.B Ribosomally synthesized protein/peptide toxins that target channels and carriers

8.C Non-ribosomally synthesized toxins that target channels and carriers

9. Incompletely characterized transport systems

9.A Recognized transporters of unknown biochemical mechanism

9.B Putative transport proteins

9.C Functionally characterized transporters lacking identified sequences

References

External links
 Transporter Classification Database
 List at qmul.ac.uk
 
 
 Classification of human transporters in pharmacology

Transport proteins
Transmembrane proteins
Protein classification
Biological databases